Roosevelt Township is the name of some places in the U.S. state of Minnesota:
Roosevelt Township, Beltrami County, Minnesota
Roosevelt Township, Crow Wing County, Minnesota

See also
 Roosevelt Township (disambiguation)
 Roosevelt, Minnesota

Minnesota township disambiguation pages